Bidentotinthia is a genus of moths in the family Sesiidae.

Species
Bidentotinthia borneana Arita & Gorbunov 2003

References

Sesiidae